Walery is a Polish given name.

People with the name

 Walery Rzewuski (1837-1888), Polish portrait photographer and alderman of Kraków
 Walery Mroczkowski (1840-1889), insurgent, anarcho-activist and photographer aka "Valerien Ostroga"
 Walery Cyryl Amrogowicz (1863–1931), Polish numismatist and philanthropist
 Walery Eljasz-Radzikowski (1841–1905), Polish painter and photographer
 Walery Jaworski (1849–1924), Polish pioneer of gastroenterology
 Walery Roman (1877–1952), Polish lawyer and politician
 Walery Sławek (1879–1939), Polish politician and activist
 Stanisław Julian Ostroróg (1830–1890), an expatriate Polish photographer who used "Walery" as a pseudonym
 Stanisław Julian Ignacy Ostroróg (1863–1929), Ostoróg's son, also known as "Walery", himself a photographer who used his father's professional name

See also 
 Walery, Masovian Voivodeship, a village in Poland

Polish masculine given names